Indian order of battle during the 2020–2021 China–India skirmishes:

Political leadership

Indian Armed Forces
Chief of Defence Staff (CDS):

Indian Army
Chief of the Army Staff (COAS): Gen. Manoj Mukund Naravane

Northern Command (Lt-Gen. Yogesh Kumar Joshi, GOC-in-C)
XIV Corps (Fire and Fury Corps) (Lt-Gen. Harinder Singh to 13 October 2020; Lt-Gen. P.G.K. Menon from 13 October 2020, GOC)
3rd Infantry (Trishul) Division (Maj-Gen. Abhijit Bapat, GOC)
81 Infantry Brigade
1 Bihar Regiment
16 Bihar Regiment (Col. B. Santosh Babu)
114 Infantry Brigade (Patrolling Point 15)
70 Infantry Brigade (Eastern Ladakh)
Elements of I Corps (Strike Corps) transferred from South-Western Command

Individual soldiers and larger elements of the following regiments under Northern Command stationed in Ladakh in 2020–2021 (mentioned for service during Operation Snow Leopard):
81 Field Artillery
16 Punjab Regiment
29 Punjab Regiment
14 Maratha Light Infantry
3 Grenadiers
6 Grenadiers
17 Kumaon Regiment
1/1 Gorkha Rifles (The Malaun Regiment)
3/1 Gorkha Rifles (The Malaun Regiment)
4 Gorkha Rifles
2 Dogra Regiment
16 Bihar Regiment
4 Mahar Regiment
13Mahar Regiment
4 Parachute Regiment
9 Parachute Regiment
2 Ladakh Scouts
4 Ladakh Scouts
18 Guards Regiment
11 Engineer Regiment
3 Infantry Division Signals Regiment

Western Command (Lt-Gen. Ravendra Pal Singh, GOC-in-C)
9 Corps (reserve brigades deployed) (Lt-Gen. Upendra Dwivedi to 26 March 2021; Lt-Gen. P.N. Ananthanarayanan from March 2021, GOC)

Eastern Command (Lt-Gen. Anil Chauhan to 31 May 2021; Lt-Gen. Manoj Pande from 1 June 2021)
IV Corps (training brigades deployed) (Lt-Gen. Shantanu Dayal to 26 January 2021; Lt-Gen. Ravin Khosla from January 2021, GOC)
XXXIII Corps (training brigades deployed) (Lt-Gen. Nav Kumar Khanduri to 13 September 2020; Lt-Gen. A.K. Singh from 14 September 2020, GOC)

Indian Navy
Chief of the Naval Staff (CNS): Adm. Karambir Singh

Western Naval Command (VAdm. Ajit Kumar P to 28 February 2021, FOC-in-C) 
Flag Officer Naval Aviation (FONA) & Flag Officer Goa Naval Area (FOGNA): RAdm. Philipose George Pynumootil

Indian Air Force
Chief of the Air Staff (CAS): ACM R. K. S. Bhadauria to 30 September 2021; ACM Vivek Ram Chaudhari from 30 September 2021

Western Air Command (AM Balakrishnan Suresh to 31 July 2020; AM Vivek Ram Chaudhari to 30 June 2021; AM Balabhadra Radha Krishna from 1 July 2021; AM Amit Dev from 1 October 2021
AOC Jammu & Kashmir (AVM P. M. Sinha)
AOC Leh (ACmde Subroto Kundu)

Indo-Tibetan Border Police
DG Surjeet Singh Deswal

North-West Frontier HQ (IG Deepam Seth)
Leh Sector (DIG)
Leh (SSP Sargun Shukla)

References

Orders of battle